Wolfgang Wendland (born 9 November 1962 in Lünen, Germany) is a German musician, actor, film producer and politician.

Wendland is lead singer of Die Kassierer, a German punk rock band.
His films concern  the regional problems of the town of  Bochum and its environment and serve to promote his band and their videos, "Außenbordmotor" and "Das Mädchen mit den drei blauen Augen".

In 2005, Wendland stood for leader of the German government for the Anarchist Pogo Party of Germany (APPD) using the slogans "work is shit" and "drinking, drinking". On 30 June 2009, he was elected into the local council of Wattenscheid, a sub district of Bochum, as a candidate without party on the Die Linke (Left Party) list.

References

External links

 Website for the  video Bochum - Der Film

Living people
The Left (Germany) politicians
21st-century German politicians
German punk rock musicians
1962 births